The Joseph Haile House (or Gardner House) is an historic house in the College Hill neighborhood of Providence, Rhode Island.  It is a -story brick structure, appearing taller than that due to its hillside location and raised basement.  It is a well-preserved example of Federal styling, which underwent a careful restoration in the 1930s by George Warren Gardner, who filled the house with early American furniture.  The Gardners bequested the property to Brown University, which uses it to house visiting dignitaries.

The house was listed on the National Register of Historic Places in 1972.

See also
National Register of Historic Places listings in Providence, Rhode Island

References

External links

Houses completed in 1806
Houses on the National Register of Historic Places in Rhode Island
Brown University buildings
Houses in Providence, Rhode Island
Historic American Buildings Survey in Rhode Island
National Register of Historic Places in Providence, Rhode Island
Historic district contributing properties in Rhode Island